VAL  may stand for:
 Variable Assembly Language, a computer-based control system and language designed specifically for use with Unimation Inc. industrial robots
 Vatican lira, the currency  of the Vatican City between 1929 and 2002
 Véhicule Automatique Léger, a type of automatic rubber-tired people mover technology
 Vieques Air Link, an airline
 VAL (duo), made up of Valeria Gribusova and Vlad Pashkevich, Belarus duo representing their country in Eurovision Song Contest 2020
 Vulnerability Assessment Laboratory, an Army research institution that specialized in electronic warfare.

See also
 Val (disambiguation)